Rogério Lantres de Carvalho (7 December 1922 – 8 December 2019), known as Rogério Pipi, was a Portuguese footballer who played mainly as a forward.

Over the course of 14 seasons, he amassed Primeira Liga totals of 245 games and 132 goals, most notably at Benfica. He gained 15 caps for the Portugal national team, scoring 2 goals.

Club career
Born in Lisbon, Carvalho began his career at local club Chelas. In 1942, he signed with Benfica, where he played 12 seasons, excepting a period in 1947, when he played for Brazilian side Botafogo. He was one of the victims, so to speak, of Otto Glória's professionalism; he left Benfica in 1954 because he did not want to quit his job, and finished his career in another local club, Oriental.

With Benfica, he won three league titles, six Portuguese cups and one Latin Cup. In total, he played 310 matches and scored 210 goals for Benfica. Carvalho holds the record of best scorer in Portuguese cup finals, with 15 goals.

Honours

Club
Benfica
Primeira Liga: 1942–43, 1944–45, 1949–50
Taça de Portugal (6): 1942–43, 1943–44, 1948–49, 1950–51, 1951–52, 1952–53
Latin Cup: 1949–50

Individual
Taça de Portugal: Top scorer 1950–51, 1951–52

References

External links

1922 births
2019 deaths
Footballers from Lisbon
Association football wingers
Association football forwards
Portuguese footballers
Portuguese expatriate footballers
Portugal international footballers
S.L. Benfica footballers
Clube Oriental de Lisboa players
Expatriate footballers in Brazil
Botafogo de Futebol e Regatas players